Gonipterini is a tribe of weevils in the subfamily Curculioninae.

The larvae and adults are usually found on eucalyptus trees, where they feed upon the foliage. The larvae are legless and slug-like in appearance. The adults have a broad body, and short stout rostrum.

Gonipterus gibberus and Gonipterus scutellatus (eucalyptus weevil) were introduced from Australia to South America, where they became pest species in eucalypt plantations. Control of Gonipterus in South America was largely achieved following the introduction from Australia of a small parasitic wasp that attacks the weevil's eggs, providing an example of biological control.

References 

 
Polyphaga tribes